Felipe Zúniga del Cid (born 27 April 1948) is a Honduran politician. He currently serves as deputy of the National Congress of Honduras representing the Liberal Party of Honduras for Intibucá.

References

1948 births
Living people
People from Intibucá Department
Deputies of the National Congress of Honduras
Liberal Party of Honduras politicians
Place of birth missing (living people)
21st-century Honduran politicians